Aily is an unincorporated community in Dickenson County, Virginia, in the United States.

History
A post office was established at Aily in 1890, and remained in operation until it was discontinued in 1963. Aily Counts was an early postmaster.

References

Unincorporated communities in Dickenson County, Virginia
Unincorporated communities in Virginia